The Portrait of a Young Man with a Book is an oil on board painting by Agnolo Bronzino, executed c. 1540. It likely depicts a literary friend of the artist holding open a collection of poetry. It entered the Metropolitan Museum of Art in New York in 1929, where it is still held.

Bibliography
The Metropolitan Museum of Art Guide, The Metropolitan Museum of Art/Yale University Press, New York/New Haven 1994/2005.

External links
Metropolitan Museum of Art.org: official Portrait of a Young Man with a Book catalogue webpage

Young Man with a Book
Young Man with a Book
1540 paintings
Young Man with a Book
Young Man with a Book
Young Man with a Book
Pourtalès Collection
Paintings in the collection of the Metropolitan Museum of Art
Books in art